Love, Cheat & Steal is a 1993 American made-for-television thriller film written and directed by William Curran and starring John Lithgow, Eric Roberts, and Mädchen Amick.

Plot 
After being released from prison, a man infiltrates his ex-wife and her rich husband's lives with vengeance.  He plots to rob his ex wife's husband's bank and expects her to succumb to his evil sexual advances and mind games.

Cast 
  John Lithgow as Paul Harrington
  Eric Roberts as Reno Adams
  Mädchen Amick as Lauren Harrington
  Richard Edson as Billy Quayle
  Donald Moffat as Frank Harrington
  David Ackroyd as Tom Kerry
  Dan O'Herlihy as Hamilton Fisk
  Jason Workman as Whit Turner
  Claude Earl Jones as The Mayor
  Bill McKinney as Kolchak
  Jack Axelrod as Mario Columbard
  John Pyper-Ferguson as Collins
  Mary Fanaro as Darlene
  Chuck Zito as Jake
  Danny Trejo as The Cuban
  Peter Lupus as A Guard

References

External links 

American thriller films
1990s thriller films
1990s American films